The Montenegro Billie Jean King Cup team represents Montenegro in the Billie Jean King Cup tennis competition and are governed by the Tennis Federation of Montenegro.  They currently compete in the Europe/Africa Zone of Group III.

History
Montenegro competed in its first Fed Cup in 2007, finishing third in their Group III pool.

Montenegrin players played for Serbia & Montenegro from 2004 to 2006 and for Yugoslavia prior to that.

Montenegro obtained its first promotion from Group III to Group II in 2011 with a win over Tunisia in Promotional Play-Off.

Current team
 Danka Kovinić
 Ana Veselinović
 Anja Drašković
 Edisa Hot

Matches 

Full list of Montenegrin women's Fed Cup team matches (since independence):

Note: Montenegro scores first

See also
Fed Cup
Montenegro Davis Cup team

External links

Billie Jean King Cup teams
Fed Cup
Fed Cup